Edward Sinclair (born 1980) is Double Olympian, World and European medallist and Ex-British and European record holder from Great Britain. He swam on a relay for Great Britain at the 2000 Olympics, and was also a member of the 2004 team.

Sinclair attended Millfield School from 1994 to 1999. After retiring (in 2005) from professional swimming Ed returned to Millfield to begin his coaching career, where he also headed the Strength & Conditioning Programme. From 2009 to 2018, Ed served as the Head Coach and Director of Swimming at Teddington Swimming Club. Currently he runs Maximum Performances, works as the Lead Swimming Coach at Guildford High School and works as a consultant for club and school swimming programmes.

In 2022 Edward was Head Swimming Coach on the ITV show The Games, where 12 celebrities took part in Olympic sports.  You can still watch the second episode featuring swimming on the ITV Hub - here.

Sinclair's swimming achievements:
1999 – 2000 – sets 3 British records: 4 × 200 m Freestyle Relay L.C. – 7.12.98 (1.49.62) – 19/09/00; 200m Freestyle S.C. –   1.45.91 – 17/03/00; 200m Freestyle S.C. – 1.46.22 - 09/12/99  
1999 – sets British record at European Short Course Championships
1999 – Medal Winner World Short Course Championships, Hong Kong – Silver 4 × 200 m Freestyle
1999 – European Short Course Championships, Lisbon: Individual British Record 200m Freestyle – 1.46.22; Individual 400m Freestyle – 4th
1999 – wins Silver medal at European Aquatics Championships
1999 – wins first National title: National Champion 200m Freestyle – Winner of the ASA Alan Hime Memorial Trophy for the best performance at the ASA National Championships
1999 – finishes the year ranked 9th in the long course World Ranking (1:48:74)
1999 – wins Silver medal at World Championships – 4 × 200 m Freestyle Relay
2000 – wins Silver medal at World Championships – 4 × 200 m Freestyle Relay 7.03.06 (1.45.91)
2000 – member of Great Britain's 5th place team in the 4×200 Freestyle Relay at the 2000 Olympics and Individual British Record (1.45.90)
2000 – end of year short course world rank: 200 free – 10th (1:45:81), 400 free – 13th (3:44:49)
2001 – end of year long course world rank: 400 free – 12th (3:50:53)
2001 – Finalist World Championships
2003 – Finalist World Championships, Barcelona
2004 – Olympic Swim Team 4 × 200 m Freestyle
2005 – Speedo League Team Champions

References 

British male swimmers
Swimmers at the 2000 Summer Olympics
Swimmers at the 2004 Summer Olympics
Living people
Medalists at the FINA World Swimming Championships (25 m)
People educated at Newland House School
European Aquatics Championships medalists in swimming
1980 births
Olympic swimmers of Great Britain
People educated at Millfield